David Cain Haughton (born 13 December 1951), known professionally as David Brandon (although originally credited as David Haughton), is an Irish actor who has mostly appeared in Italian films. He has appeared in more than sixty films since 1978, including the title role in Joe D'Amato's controversial Caligula... The Untold Story (1982). Before working in film, he was a member of Lindsay Kemp's theatre company, where his roles included Jokanaan in Kemp's all-male production of Salomé (1975). He lives in Rome.

Selected filmography

References

External links 
 

1950s births
Living people
American male film actors